The  was an electric multiple unit (EMU) train type introduced in 1966 by Japanese National Railways (JNR), and later operated by East Japan Railway Company (JR East) on Chuo-Sobu Line and Tozai Line subway through-running services in Tokyo, Japan, until 2003.

Design
Broadly based on the 103 series commuter EMU, the 301 series was designed specifically for use on through-running services with the Eidan Tozai Line (present-day Tokyo Metro Tozai Line) in Tokyo, and was the first aluminium-bodied rolling stock introduced on Japanese National Railways (JNR).

When first delivered, the sets were finished with a clear acrylic paint, giving an unpainted appearance. The sets were subsequently painted in light grey with a yellow bodyside stripe. This was later changed to a light blue ("Blue No. 22") stripe to match the Tōzai Line line colour.

For cost reasons, only 56 vehicles were built, and subsequent rolling stock built for Tozai Line through-running services was conventional steel-bodied 103-1200 series stock.

Operations
The 301 series trains were based at Mitaka Depot in Tokyo throughout their service life, and were used on Chūō-Sōbu Line local and Tozai Line subway through-running services.

Formations

Following reforming into 10-car sets, the fleet was formed as follows, with car 1 at the Nishi-Funabashi end and car 10 at the Mitaka end. Sets K1 and K2 included former KuHa 301 and KuMoHa 300 driving cars with driving cab equipment removed.

Sets K1–2

Cars 2, 4, 7, and 9 were each equipped with one lozenge-type pantograph.

Sets K3–5

Cars 2, 4, 7, and 9 were each equipped with one lozenge-type pantograph. SaHa 301-101 was modified from former MoHa 301-4, and retained the original pantograph mounting points.

Interior
Seating consisted of longitudinal bench seating throughout.

History
The 301 series were delivered in 1966 to Mitaka Depot in Tokyo, initially formed as eight 7-car sets. From 1981, the fleet was reformed into 10-car sets with the creation of SaHa 301 trailer cars converted from former MoHa 300 and MoHa 301 motored cars.

As of 1 April 2002, 50 vehicles (5 x 10-car sets) remained in service, but the fleet was subsequently replaced by new E231-800 series EMUs and withdrawn during 2003.

A special Sayonara 301 series train was run by JR East on 3 August 2003.

Preserved examples

Driving car KuMoHa 300-4 of set K2 is stored at JR East's Omiya Works, removed in 2017.

References

Electric multiple units of Japan
East Japan Railway Company
Train-related introductions in 1966
Kawasaki multiple units
Nippon Sharyo multiple units
1500 V DC multiple units of Japan